Queset House is a house located at 51 Main Street, North Easton, Massachusetts next to the Ames Free Library. The house was built in 1854 from a design by noted architect Andrew Jackson Downing under commission from industrialist Oakes Angier Ames. In 1872 John Ames Mitchell designed its rear extension. Landscape architect Frederick Law Olmsted planned its grounds.  

The Ames Free Library purchased the house in 2007. The building is used as an extension of the library's special programs, including monthly meetings of library groups.

References

 Downing, A. J. (Andrew Jackson), Rural essays, G.P. Putnam : New York, 1853

Houses in Bristol County, Massachusetts
Butler–Ames family
Easton, Massachusetts